Achates Power is an American developer of opposed-piston, two-stroke, compression ignition engines for use in commercial and passenger vehicles.  Based in San Diego, California, the company was founded in 2004 by James U Lemke.

According to Achates Power, its opposed-piston, two-stroke engine has demonstrated an increase in fuel efficiency and similar engine-out emissions levels. In 2014, the company published a technical paper citing a 30 percent fuel economy improvement when its engine was benchmarked against a next-generation diesel engine equipped with advanced technologies.

In December 2012, the company announced that it had been selected as a subcontractor to AVL Powertrain Engineering, Inc. to build the next-generation combat engine for the U.S. Army. Less than a year later, in October 2013, Achates Power and Fairbanks Morse Engine signed a joint development and licensing agreement to reduce emissions and fuel consumption of Fairbanks Morse proprietary and dual-fuel opposed-piston engines.

Achates Power is privately owned and backed by Sequoia Capital, RockPort Capital Partners, Madrone Capital Partners, Triangle Peak Partners and Interwest Partners.

Engine 

The Achates Power opposed-piston engine,  is modeled after the opposed-piston architecture made popular by the  Junkers Jumo 205/207 aviation engines developed in the 1930s. The design positions two pistons per cylinder—working in opposite, reciprocating motion. This eliminates parts including the cylinder head and valvetrain, improving overall engine efficiency as these components are considered primary contributors to heat and friction losses.  The cylinder head and valvetrain systems are also among the most complex and costly elements of conventional engines.
The two-stroke cycle compounds the efficiency benefits of the opposed-piston engine architecture.  With this cycle, each combustion event is shorter in duration and, therefore, closer to optimum timing as compared to four-stroke engines.  Two-stroke engines are also smaller in displacement and size compared to four-stroke engines for similar performance.

While development of historic opposed-piston engines ceased for use in on-road car and truck applications with the introduction of modern emissions standards, Achates Power says that it has patented many modifications to the original architecture in order to meet current standards.

Emission reduction claims
Achates claims that its two-stroke opposed piston engine can achieve lower emissions of nitrogen oxides (NOx) than an equivalent four-stroke engine for several reasons. For example:
 The Selective catalytic reduction (SCR) system can be brought up to optimum working temperature more quickly
 Exhaust gas recirculation (EGR) can be controlled by varying the pressure differential between the inlet and exhaust manifolds

Development Timeline

2004: Company founded by James Lemke with investment from the late John Walton, son of Sam Walton, the founder of Wal-Mart Stores, Inc.
2005: Engine testing begins at the company's in-house test cell
2007: Series A venture capital round led by Sequoia Capital with investments from RockPort Capital Partners, Madrone Capital Partners and InterWest Partners; company receives DARPA contract to design lightweight, compact UAV engine
2008: 500 hours of testing completed
2009: Second company test cell commissioned; Series B venture capital round led with new investor, Triangle Peak Partners
2010: Engine passes NATO 50-hour cyclic durability test; over 1,000 hours of testing completed; additional test stand added to company facility
2011: Over 2,500 hours of testing completed
2012: First firing of the company's A48 opposed-piston, double crank, spur gear train engine; company surpasses 3,600 hours of total test time; along with AVL Powertrain Engineering, Inc., Achates Power is selected by the U.S. Army to develop next-generation combat engine
2013: Achates Power selected for Frost & Sullivan 2013 North American New Product Innovation Award in the medium- and heavy-duty commercial vehicle engine market; company exceeds 4,500 hours of total test time; company named first runner-up in Securing America's Future Energy (SAFE) “Energy Security Prize”; Fairbanks Morse Engine signs joint development and licensing agreement with Achates Power
2014: Achates Power engine surpasses 5,000 hours of dynamometer testing; company releases results of light-duty diesel engine study comparing its engine to a next-generation diesel engine benchmark

2015: The company is awarded a $14 million military contract by the U.S. Army Tank Automotive Research, Development and Engineering Center to help in the development of the Army's "future fighting vehicle"

References

External links
 Achates Power Official Website
 Prospects for Overhaul of Combustion Engine, Bloomberg TV. September 21, 2011.
 Start-Ups Work to Reinvent the Combustion Engine, New York Times. March 30, 2011.
 25 Companies to Watch in Energy Tech, Bloomberg Businessweek. July 14, 2009.
 8 Greentech Trends to Watch, CNN Money. May 11, 2011.
 Cheap, High MPG Engines--But. . ., Automotive News. March 5, 2012.
 An Engine That Uses One-Third Less Fuel. . ., MIT Technology Review. January 14, 2013.
 Opposed Piston Engines Website

Engine manufacturers of the United States
American companies established in 2004
Manufacturing companies established in 2004
Manufacturing companies based in California
2004 establishments in California